Meridian Township may refer to:

 Meridian Township, Clinton County, Illinois
 Meridian Township, McPherson County, Kansas
 Meridian Charter Township, Michigan

Township name disambiguation pages